The Florida Stars were an American soccer team based in North Miami, Florida that played in the USISL. The club moved to the USISL Pro League in 1995.

Year-by-year

Defunct soccer clubs in Florida
Soccer clubs in Miami
USISL teams
Soccer clubs in Florida
1994 establishments in Florida
1995 disestablishments in Florida
Association football clubs established in 1994
Association football clubs disestablished in 1995